The Istanbul Shopping Fest is an annual shopping fest held in Istanbul, Turkey. Established in 2011, the mission of the Festival is to make Istanbul the shopping, culture and entertainment center of the world.

During the festival, which lasts 40 days and 40 nights, all the contributing shops offer special discounts. The festival especially attracts foreign tourists as the shops offer tax free shopping. The historic sites in Istanbul also participate in the festival by closing two hours later than usual.

History
The first Istanbul Shopping Fest took place between 18 March and 26 April 2011 and lasted for 40 days.

See also

 List of shopping malls in Istanbul

Notes

External links
Istanbul Shopping Fest
Official Facebook page

Shopping festivals
Festivals in Istanbul
Economy of Istanbul
Festivals established in 2011
2011 establishments in Turkey
Spring (season) events in Turkey